Alexander Kasidit Sieghart (born 29 July 1994) is a Thai professional footballer who plays as a midfielder or a left back.

Early life
Sieghart was born in Bangkok to a German father and a Thai mother. He moved to Munich with his parents when he was 6 years old. Sieghart started to train with FC Bayern Munich's youth system in 2009 when he was 14 years old. He has a younger brother, Marcel, who was also trained by Bayern's academy.

Club career

Bayern Munich youth
Sieghart trained with Bayern Munich between 2009 and 2015 season. In 2012–13, he played 24 games and scored 5 goals for Bayern Munich in Under 19 Bundesliga. He also featured in Bayern Munich II in Regionalliga between 2012 and 2015 season.

In October 2012, 18-year-old Sieghart made his first two goals for Bayern Munich senior squad in the friendly match which the Bayern won 7–0 against SC Fürstenfeldbruck.

SpVgg Unterhaching
In 2015, Sieghart joined SpVgg Unterhaching in Regionalliga by the free transfer. He played 29 games in that season and helped the club to finish at the fourth place of the final standing.

Buriram United
On 14 June 2016, Sieghart announced that he would return to Thailand to play for Buriram United in the Thai League 1. Seighart wears number 23 shirt for Buriram United. He featured in the second half of 2016 Thai League.

Bangkok United
In February 2017, Sieghart moved from Buriram United to the league rivalry side, Bangkok United.

Club statistics

Honours

Club
Bayern Munich II
 Regionalliga: 2013-14

Buriram United
 Thai League Cup: 2016

References

External links
 

1994 births
Living people
Alexander Sieghart
German footballers
Alexander Sieghart
Association football midfielders
2. Bundesliga players
FC Bayern Munich II players
SpVgg Unterhaching players
Alexander Sieghart
Alexander Sieghart
Alexander Sieghart
Expatriate footballers in Thailand
Thai expatriate sportspeople in Germany
Alexander Sieghart
Alexander Sieghart